Memory Serves is a 1981 album by the New York based No Wave music group Material.

Track listing
"Memory Serves" (Bill Laswell, Michael Beinhorn) – 5:08
"Disappearing" (Olu Dara, Sonny Sharrock, Laswell, Beinhorn, Fred Maher) – 7:11
"Upriver" (Billy Bang, Laswell, Beinhorn, Maher) – 5:25
"Metal Test" (Fred Frith, Laswell, Beinhorn, Maher) – 4:30
"Conform To The Rhythm" (Laswell, Beinhorn, Frith) – 4:30
"Unauthorized" (Sharrock, Laswell, Maher) – 3:50
"Square Dance" (Frith, Laswell, Maher) – 4:29
"Silent Land" (George Lewis, Laswell, Beinhorn) – 3:48
"For A Few Dollars More" (E. Morricone) - 3:51 (7" edit, bonus track on CD release)

Personnel
Material
Bill Laswell – 4, 6 and 8 string basses
Michael Beinhorn – synthesizers, tapes, radio, guitar, drums, voice.
Fred Maher – drums, percussion, guitar (except "Silent Land")

Additional personnel
Sonny Sharrock – guitar (except "Square Dance" and "Silent Land")
Fred Frith – guitar, violin, xylophone (1,4,5,7)
Olu Dara – cornet ("Disappearing", "Upriver")
Henry Threadgill – alto sax ("Disappearing", "Unauthorized", "Square Dance")
George Lewis – trombone ("Memory Serves", "Square Dance", "Silent Land")
Billy Bang – violin ("Upriver", "Unauthorized")
Charles K. Noyes – drums, percussion, bells ("Memory Serves", "Silent Land")

Production
Recorded at OAO Studio, Brooklyn, New York. Produced by Material with Martin Bisi.

References

1981 albums
Material (band) albums
Post-punk albums by American artists
Albums produced by Martin Bisi
Elektra/Musician albums
Celluloid Records albums